Til Tuesday (often stylized as til tuesday) was an American new wave band formed in Boston, Massachusetts, United States. The band, consisting of Aimee Mann (lead vocals, bass), Robert Holmes (guitar), Joey Pesce (keyboards), and Michael Hausman (drums), was active from 1982 to 1989. They are best known for their 1985 hit single "Voices Carry".

History
'Til Tuesday first gained fame six months after its formation when it won Boston's WBCN Rock & Roll Rumble in 1983. Their original composition "Love in a Vacuum" (credited to all members of the group) received a fair amount of airplay on the station, and the group was eventually signed to Epic Records.

"Love in a Vacuum" was re-recorded for the Epic debut album, 1985's Voices Carry; however, the breakthrough song turned out to be the title track. The "Voices Carry" single peaked at number eight on the U.S. Billboard Hot 100, and is said to have been inspired by an argument between Mann and Hausman, who had broken off a relationship before the album's release. According to producer Mike Thorne on his Stereo Society web site, "The title track was originally written and sung by Aimee as if to a woman.... The record company was predictably unhappy with such lyrics."

The band became an early MTV staple with the "Voices Carry" video, which depicts an domineering boyfriend trying to convert Mann to his upper-class lifestyle; she finally lashes out at him during a concert, standing up from her seat in the audience and removing her cap to reveal her signature spiky, rat-tailed hair. The group won that year's MTV Video Music Award for Best New Artist.

By the 1986 follow-up Welcome Home, Mann was beginning to write more of the songs herself and the band was moving away from the slick new wave sound of their debut. But while critical reaction was generally strong, the #26 placing for the lead single, "What About Love", was a commercial disappointment, especially after the top-ten success of "Voices Carry". Even more problematic, the album just barely sneaked into the U.S. top 50, also a letdown after the #19 placing for their debut.

After the album's release Pesce left the band and was replaced by Michael Montes.  At about the same time, Mann's two-year relationship with singer-songwriter Jules Shear, whom she had been dating since the release of the Voices Carry album, came to an end. This breakup somewhat informed the band's final album, 1988's Everything's Different Now, particularly in the song "J for Jules", though Mann insisted that not every song on the LP was about the relationship. Shear collaborated with Matthew Sweet on the album's title track; it also featured "The Other End (Of the Telescope)", a collaboration between Mann and Elvis Costello on which Costello provides a guest vocal.  Holmes and Montes played on every track of the album, but Holmes left before its release; for live dates, Til Tuesday was now a duo of Mann and Hausmann, supported by session musicians.

While critical praise continued to flow, Everything's Different Now album peaked at No. 124 in the U.S., while the lead single "(Believed You Were) Lucky" (co-written with Shear) reached number 95. 
  
'Til Tuesday essentially broke up after the release of Everything's Different Now. However, for a short time Mann continued to tour under the 'Til Tuesday name with various session players (including guitarists Jon Brion and Clayton Scoble as well as keyboardist Michael Montes) while legal problems with the band's label Epic prevented her from beginning work on a solo record for several years.

Personnel
Aimee Mann – lead vocals, bass guitar, acoustic guitar (1982–1989)
Robert Holmes – guitar, backing vocals (1982–1989)
Joey Pesce – keyboards, synthesizer, piano, backing vocals (1982–1987)
Michael Hausman – drums, percussion (1982–1989)
Michael Montes – keyboards (1987–1989)

Touring members
Jon Brion – guitar, bass guitar
Clayton Scoble – guitar
Dave Darby – bass guitar

Discography

Studio albums

Compilation albums 

 Coming Up Close: A Retrospective (1996, Epic)

Singles

References

1982 establishments in the United States
Musical groups established in 1982
1989 disestablishments in the United States
Musical groups disestablished in 1989
American new wave musical groups
Musical groups from Boston
Aimee Mann
Epic Records artists
American alternative rock groups
Female-fronted musical groups